Diary Of The Triplets is a 2015 Nigerian serial classic comedy film, written, produced and directed by Bright Wonder Obasi. This movies stars Kalu Ikeagwu and OAP, Big Mo. The movie was premiered at the Silverbird Cinema in Abuja, on the 26th, 27th and 28 June 2015.

Synopsis 
This film chronicles the story of three young men, who embarked on a journey in pursuit of success. Raised by Christian parents, in Christian homes, however pushed by an irresistible desire for success, and are ready to do virtually anything to break out of poverty.

Cast 

 Kalu Ikeagwu
 Big Mo
 Bright Wonder Obasi
 Osas Iyamu
 Iyke Adiele
 Apel Orduen

Production 
A High Definition Film Studios production

Release 
Diary of the Triplet was premiered on 26, 27, and 28 June 2015, at the Silverbird Cinema, Abuja.

Award

References 

Nigerian comedy-drama films
2015 comedy-drama films
2010s English-language films
English-language Nigerian films